Ringoma is a city and commune of Angola, located in the province of Bié.

See also 

 Communes of Angola

References 

Populated places in Bié Province
Municipalities of Angola